Norbury is in Greater Manchester, England. A civil parish in Cheshire from 1866 to 1900, it now forms part of Hazel Grove in the Metropolitan Borough of Stockport.

Norbury was one of the eight civil parishes of Cheshire to be included in the Stockport rural sanitary district in 1875. From 1894 it formed part of the Stockport Rural District. In 1900 the parish was abolished and it became part of the Hazel Grove and Bramhall civil parish and urban district. Hazel Grove and Bramhall was abolished in 1974 and Norbury has since formed part of the Metropolitan Borough of Stockport in Greater Manchester.

References

Geography of the Metropolitan Borough of Stockport
Areas of Greater Manchester